Bill Palmer may refer to:

Billy Palmer (1887–1955), British association footballer 
Billy Palmer (baseball) (fl. 1885), 19th-century baseball player
Willard Palmer (1917–1996), American musician and composer
 Bill Palmer, who writes the political website Palmer Report

See also
Will Palmer, born 1997, a British Motor racing driver
William Palmer (disambiguation)